Mary Ann Castle, née Mary Ann Noblett, (January 22, 1931 – April 29, 1998) was an American actress. She appeared in the films  When the Redskins Rode in 1951, Three Steps to the Gallows in 1953 and Gunsmoke in 1953. In 1954 she appeared opposite Jim Davis as 'Frankie Adams' in the television series Stories of the Century.

On November 13, 1959, while in jail in Beverly Hills on a charge of drunkenness, she attempted to hang herself.

Castle also faced financial problems that resulted in legal action. In December 1959, she told a superior court that she had no money when an interior designer got a $4,500 judgment against her. On February 25, 1960, Castle filed a bankruptcy petition listing $300 worth of clothes as assets and $13,678 in debts. In April 1960, a debt warrant was served on her after she was booked on a drunk charge. Officers had found her lying on the front seat of a car in a parking lot.

Filmography

References

Actresses from Texas
American film actresses
American television actresses
Deaths from lung cancer in California
People from Pampa, Texas
Actresses from California
1931 births
1998 deaths
20th-century American actresses
American people of Native American descent
Western (genre) film actresses